Fleur Nicolette Andrea van de Kieft (born 22 October 1973 in Amsterdam) is a former field hockey striker from the Netherlands, who played 137 official international matches for Holland, in which she scored a total number of 44 goals.

Van de Kieft was a member of the Dutch Women's Team that won the bronze medal at the 2000 Summer Olympics, after defeating Spain (2-0) in the third place match. Four years earlier, when Atlanta, Georgia hosted the Games, she won her first Olympic bronze medal.

A player from Laren and Rotterdam Van de Kieft made her debut for the Dutch on 29 January 1996 in a friendly against the United States. Her last cap came on 1 September 2002, when Holland defeated Australia: 4–3.

References
KNHB Profile

External links
 

1973 births
Living people
Dutch female field hockey players
Olympic field hockey players of the Netherlands
Field hockey players at the 1996 Summer Olympics
Field hockey players at the 2000 Summer Olympics
Field hockey players from Amsterdam
Olympic bronze medalists for the Netherlands
Olympic medalists in field hockey
Medalists at the 1996 Summer Olympics
Medalists at the 2000 Summer Olympics
20th-century Dutch women
21st-century Dutch women